Doris Gluth (born 19 December 1955) is a German middle-distance runner. She competed in the women's 800 metres at the 1976 Summer Olympics.

References

1955 births
Living people
Athletes (track and field) at the 1976 Summer Olympics
German female middle-distance runners
Olympic athletes of East Germany
Place of birth missing (living people)